Spencer Lake extends southward from Fish Pond in Hobbstown township into Maine township 3, range 5. The north end of the lake receives drainage from Whipple Bog, Whipple Pond, Hall Pond, Toby Pond, and Chub Pond through Fish Pond. The lake supports a native population of lake trout and brook trout, and has been stocked with land-locked Atlantic salmon.

Sources

Lakes of Somerset County, Maine
Lakes of Maine